Jalamah, also spelled as Djélémé or Jalmé is a town in northern Syria situated in Afrin District. Nearby localities include Jindires to the northwest, Askê to the east and Afrin to the northeast. On March 11, 2018, the town came under the control of the Syrian National Army.

References

Populated places in Afrin District
Kurdish communities in Syria
Towns in Aleppo Governorate